Nikola Stamenić (born 17 April 1949), also known as "The General", is a Serbian water polo coach widely considered one of the greatest coaches in water polo history. Under his guidance, Yugoslavia men's national water polo team won the gold medal in both the 1991 World Championship in Perth and the 1991 European Championship in Athens, becoming World and European Champions in the same year. At club level he successfully coached (most notably) Olympiacos, Crvena Zvezda, Partizan, Bečej and Marseille.

Playing career 
Stamenić was born in Belgrade, Serbia, SFR Yugoslavia. He played water polo most notably for Partizan Belgrade, where he won two back-to-back European Champions Cups in 1975 and 1976 under the guidance of coach Vlaho Orlić. He was also a member of the Yugoslavia men's national water polo team, winning two bronze medals in the 1973 World Championship in Belgrade and the 1974 European Championship in Vienna.

Coaching career 
In 1988, after the departure of Ratko Rudić, he became the head coach of Yugoslavia men's national water polo team (and after 1992, head coach of the Serbia men's national water polo team until 1999). Under his guidance, Yugoslavia was crowned World and European Champions in 1991 and won numerous gold and silver medals in many major international water polo competitions.

At club level he coached VK Crvena zvezda to the first National Championship in their history in 1992. Stamenić then moved to Greece, where he coached ANO Glyfada from 1994 to 1997. In 1997 he coached VK Bečej and led them to the domestic double, winning both the Serbian Championship and Cup. In 1998 he became coach of Olympiacos and led the Greek powerhouse in two consecutive Greek Championships (1999, 2000) as well as the final of the 1999 LEN Cup Winners' Cup. He became a legend for the club and his contribution to Olympiacos and to Greek water polo in general is considered enormous. He coached CN Marseille from 2002 to 2005 and won the French Championship in 2005, which was Marseille's first championship title since 1996. His training methods, his tactics and his deep understanding of every aspect of the game of water polo exerted a great influence on every player that ever played under his guidance.

See also
 List of world champions in men's water polo

External links
 Athens 1991: Stamenić leads Yugoslavia to gold
 Nikola Stamenić and Ratko Rudić

References

Living people
Olympiacos Water Polo Club coaches
Serbian water polo coaches
Serbian male water polo players
Yugoslav male water polo players
Sportspeople from Belgrade
1949 births
World Aquatics Championships medalists in water polo
Mediterranean Games gold medalists for Yugoslavia
Mediterranean Games silver medalists for Yugoslavia
Competitors at the 1991 Mediterranean Games
Competitors at the 1997 Mediterranean Games
Mediterranean Games medalists in water polo
Yugoslav water polo coaches